Vrba is a village situated in Kraljevo municipality in Serbia.

References

Vrba (Kraljevo)

Populated places in Raška District